Edward Hugh Crofton (7 September 1854 – 15 May 1882) was an English first-class cricketer. Crofton was a right-handed batsman.

Crofton made his first-class debut for Hampshire in 1881 against Sussex. Crofton made two more first-class appearances for Hampshire from in 1881, with both matches coming against the Marylebone Cricket Club.

Crofton was a lieutenant in the Rifle Brigade at the time of his death on 15 May 1882 in Kilmainham, Dublin, Ireland. Crofton was just 27 when he died.

External links
Edward Crofton at Cricinfo
Edward Crofton at CricketArchive

1854 births
1882 deaths
Cricketers from Plymouth, Devon
English cricketers
Hampshire cricketers
English cricket umpires
Rifle Brigade officers